Lyon Clerk and Keeper of the Records is a legal and heraldic office in Scotland. The holder of this office is appointed by the Crown, and like the Lord Lyon King of Arms receives an annual salary. Lyon Clerk's duties include heraldic research, the preparation of papers, lectures and conducting and assisting with the preliminary business of application for a grant or matriculation of armorial bearings. This includes scrutiny of documents supporting the application. As Keeper of the Records the duties include maintaining the records of the Court of the Lord Lyon, overseeing the preparation of documents, allowing inspection of the Public Register of All Arms and Bearings in Scotland and other records, and issuing certified extracts when required. Until 1867 there was a Lyon Clerk Depute, and in 1986 Elizabeth Ann Roads became the first woman appointed to the office of Lyon Clerk and Keeper of the Records.

Role

In 1669 the Parliament of Scotland passed the Lyon King of Arms Act of 1669, the act confirmed the privileges and emoluments of the: '"Lyon King at Armes and his breethren heraulds and pursevants their Clerk of Court and thair successors". The Lyon King of Arms Act of 1672 mentioned the 'Lyon Clerk' as one of the recipients of all documents, on behalf of the Lord Lyon King of Arms.

The Lyon Clerk, together with the Lord Lyon King of Arms, the Procurator fiscal, the Herald painter and the Macer of the Court constitutes the Court of the Lord Lyon. The Lyon Court is a part of the Scottish judiciary and deals with the subject of heraldry and genealogy in Scotland. The Lyon Clerk assists the Lord Lyon in both his ministerial and judicial work. The Lyon Clerk is appointed by the Crown through the Royal sign-manual, the appointment is then published in the Edinburgh Gazette. The Lyon Clerk's salary is paid for by the Crown. This has been the case since the Lyon King of Arms Act of 1867, when the whole of the Lyon Court and Her Majesty's Officers of Arms were formally made into civil servants. Prior to this reform the Lyon Clerk received fees for every grant and matriculation. In 1837 the Lyon Clerk is paid £19 6s. for a grant of arms with supporters and £15 15s. without, for a matriculation £4 10s. 6d with supporters and £2 17s. without.    

The Lyon Clerks have a prominent role in the operations of the Lyon Court. Every submission of application for a grant of arms, a matriculation of arms or the recording of genealogy must be made through the Lyon Clerk. This submission must be done either personally, by an intermediary agent or by correspondence, the Lyon Clerk is required to personally interview and reply to each applicant. As such the Lyon Clerk must take receipt of all documents and evidence submitted by the applicant in each case. Finally after the grant or matriculation has been made the Lyon Clerk must ensure that the resulting patent of arms is properly illuminated and emblazoned for the applicant and for the Lyon Court's register.

As Keeper of the Records, the Lyon Clerk is responsible for the maintenance of the Public Register of All Arms and Bearings in Scotland. This is done through the regular addition of new grants and matriculations. The Lyon Clerk must ensure that members of the public have access to the register by facilitating searches and studies of the records.

Lyon Clerks and Keepers of the Records

Lyon Clerks Depute

See also

Heraldry Society of Scotland

References
Appointments

Citations

Bibliography

External links
The Court of the Lord Lyon
The Heraldry Society of Scotland

Scottish heraldry